"That's Where the Happy People Go" is a crossover single by Philadelphia-based disco group the Trammps. Released in December 1975, the single hit number one on the disco chart for two weeks in May 1976.  "That's Where the Happy People Go"  also reached number twelve on the soul chart and number twenty-seven on the Hot 100. Outside the US, "That's Where the Happy People Go" went to number thirty-five in the UK.

Chart positions

References

1975 singles
1975 songs
The Trammps songs
Disco songs
Song articles with missing songwriters